The Kerala State Film Award for Best Debut Director winners:

References
Official website
PRD, Govt. of Kerala: Awardees List

Kerala State Film Awards
Directorial debut film awards